William Alfred Goldsworthy (August 24, 1944 – March 29, 1996) was a professional ice hockey right winger who played for three teams in the National Hockey League for 14 seasons between 1964 and 1978, mostly with the Minnesota North Stars. He retired from playing after two partial seasons in the World Hockey Association.

Playing career
Signed by the Boston Bruins of the NHL as a teenager, Goldsworthy played his junior days with the Bruins' Ontario Hockey Association affiliate Niagara Falls Flyers, a powerful team with future NHL stars Derek Sanderson, Bernie Parent, Jean Pronovost, Don Marcotte, Doug Favell and Rosaire Paiement among numerous others.  Even with such a strong squad, Goldsworthy finished second and third in team scoring his final two seasons with the club, en route to a Memorial Cup finals appearance in 1963 and winning it outright in 1965 in a series marked by brawls and suspensions.  The latter season saw Goldsworthy's NHL debut, playing two scoreless games with the Bruins.

Goldsworthy's first two NHL goals came on December 12, 1965 in Boston's 5-3 loss to Detroit at Boston Garden.

With big league jobs tight in the days of the Original Six, Goldsworthy served a minor league apprenticeship the next two seasons, playing with the Oklahoma City Blazers of the Central Hockey League and the Buffalo Bisons of the American Hockey League between occasional callups to Boston.

As it did with many other players, league expansion in 1967 gave Goldsworthy a full-time spot in the NHL.  Drafted in the midrounds by the Minnesota North Stars, he became an immediate starter, showing his promise in the playoffs in Minnesota's debut season, scoring eight goals and fifteen points in fourteen games as the North Stars came within a game of reaching the Stanley Cup finals.  His true break-out season came in 1970, when he scored 36 goals to begin a stretch where, teamed with skilled playmakers such as Dennis Hextall and Jude Drouin, he scored thirty or more goals in five of the next six seasons to become the North Stars' first great scoring star.

His best offensive season was the 1974 season, when he set career highs in goals with 48 and points with 74, which saw him just missing a nomination to the Second All-Star Team at right wing.  He cemented his popularity with Minnesota fans with the "Goldy Shuffle," a celebration Goldsworthy performed after each goal at home.  Named team captain in 1975 after Ted Harris' trade, Goldsworthy served in that capacity for two seasons.

By 1976, the North Stars were in a rebuilding mode, having failed to make the playoffs in three years.  In a decline due to an alcoholism problem which would become chronic, Goldsworthy was dealt to the New York Rangers.  Early the next season, his skills in a sharp decline, he was the first NHL player traded outright to a World Hockey Association squad, the Indianapolis Racers where he was player-coach. He was further dealt to the Edmonton Oilers for the 1979 season, where he played 17 games to finish out his playing career.

International play
Goldsworthy was a part of Team Canada in the 1972 Summit Series, but played in only three games, scoring a goal and an assist.

Retirement
Goldsworthy played 771 career NHL games, scoring 283 goals and 258 assists for 541 points, and added 18 goals and 19 assists in 40 playoff games.  The North Stars retired his jersey number 8 on February 15, 1992.

After his retirement, Goldsworthy went into coaching, most notably for the Louisville Icehawks of the ECHL. He was also a scout for the San Jose Sharks.

Bill Goldsworthy died in 1996 of complications from AIDS, the first professional hockey player publicly known to have the disease.  He was diagnosed in November 1994, and told the St. Paul Pioneer Press in 1995 that his health problems stemmed from drinking and promiscuity.  He was buried in Lakewood Cemetery in Minneapolis.

Awards and achievements
Played in four NHL All-Star Games (1970, 1972, 1974, 1976).
Retired as the leading goal and point scorer for the North Stars franchise.
Was the first player for an expansion team to score 200 and 250 goals.

Career statistics

Regular season and playoffs

International

Coaching record

References

External links
 
 One for the Ages: Bill Goldsworthy's 1973-74 Season

1944 births
1996 deaths
AIDS-related deaths in Minnesota
Boston Bruins players
Canadian ice hockey right wingers
Edmonton Oilers (WHA) players
Ice hockey people from Ontario
Indianapolis Racers
Indianapolis Racers players
Minnesota North Stars players
National Hockey League players with retired numbers
New Haven Nighthawks players
New York Rangers players
Niagara Falls Flyers players
San Jose Sharks scouts
Sportspeople from Waterloo, Ontario
Minnesota North Stars announcers